Šumice Cultural and Sports Center is an indoor sports arena located in Voždovac, Belgrade, Serbia.

The hall is used for basketball, handball, indoor football, volleyball, and other sports.

The venue was opened on 24 May 1974 and was originally known as the "Vоždovac Pioneers Home". Due to the lack of funds and bad maintenance, the venue has been in bad financial situation since the late 1980s and especially since the 2000s.

The venue was partially reconstructed (congress hall, press hall, roof) in September–November 2017.

See also
 List of indoor arenas in Serbia

References

External links
 Center for culture and sport "Šumice" website
 

1974 establishments in Serbia
Sports venues completed in 1974
Entertainment venues in Belgrade
BKK Radnički
OKK Beograd
Sports venues in Belgrade
Indoor arenas in Serbia
Basketball venues in Serbia
Handball venues in Serbia
Volleyball venues in Serbia
Yugoslav Serbian architecture